Tipping the Velvet is a 2002 BBC television drama serial based on the best-selling 1998 debut novel of the same name by Sarah Waters. It originally screened in three episodes on BBC Two and was produced for the BBC by the independent production company Sally Head Productions. It stars Rachael Stirling, Keeley Hawes, and Jodhi May.

Directed by Geoffrey Sax, the novel was adapted by screenwriter Andrew Davies. The production was made available on DVD by BBC Worldwide soon after broadcast.

Background and development
The BBC had previously aired an adaptation of Oranges Are Not the Only Fruit in 1990 and some other scenes in dramas to follow, but none had been so explicit in its depiction of lesbian sexual relations. Sally Head Productions defended the decision to air the entire programme uncut. Waters was quite surprised that the BBC chose to produce and broadcast a television adaptation that faithfully followed the relish and detail of sexual escapades in the book. Stirling thoroughly enjoyed the role, despite her avowed heterosexuality: "To counteract any hard-core sex within it, there's a huge sense of humour and a huge sense of fun and frivolity and joy of life. It was so utterly believable that you never for a moment thought, "fuck, there's no reason why I'm standing here naked."

Screenwriter Andrew Davies said he was attracted to the story because it featured a girl transitioning into womanhood and it included his interests in Victorian erotica; he compared it to Pride and Prejudice—for which he wrote the BBC screenplay—"with dirty bits". Both Waters and Davies were concerned about the use of dildos in scenes with Diana, but the BBC allowed it.

Waters especially appreciated the way Davies interpreted Kitty's ambivalence about being in love with Nan. He wrote the line for her, "I hate the way you make me feel", which according to Waters crystallises Kitty's complicated emotions well. The music in the adaptation was written for the film. Waters wrote song titles but not lyrics in the music references in the novel. For one song, during Kitty and Nan's first performance in the adaptation, Davies wrote a composition that had Kitty show Nan—dressed and performing as brothers—how to pick up girls in the park. It involved Kitty teaching Nan how to kiss, which they do onstage in front of audiences who are watching women, dressed as men, who are in reality having an affair with each other beyond the view of the audience. Waters wrote a similar description as Nan compares their act to their relationship; their sexual encounters to their performance onstage, noting the irony that Kitty insisted on absolute secrecy yet there they performed in front of thousands: "You are too slow—you go too fast—not there, but here—that's good—that's better! It was as if we walked before the crimson curtain, lay down upon the boards and kissed and fondled—and were clapped, and cheered, and paid for it!"

Cast

Filming locations
The production team visited Whitstable in Kent, where Nancy Astley (Rachael Stirling) lived with her family, before she leaves for London. The Chatham Dockyard was used to double as London for the street scenes.

References

External links
 
Tipping the Velvet at bbc.co.uk
 

2002 British television series debuts
2002 British television series endings
2000s British LGBT-related drama television series
2000s British romance television series
2000s British television miniseries
2000s romantic drama television series
BBC romance television shows
BBC television dramas
BBC television miniseries
British romantic drama television series
English-language television shows
Lesbian-related films
Lesbian-related television shows
Television shows written by Andrew Davies
Television shows based on British novels
Television series set in the 1890s
Television shows shot in Kent
Television shows set in London